The Oblate School of Theology is a Catholic graduate school for theological studies in San Antonio, Texas. It was founded in 1903 by the Missionary Oblates of Mary Immaculate. Dr. Scott Woodward has served as its president since October 2020.

Campus 
The Oblate School of Theology has a 41-acre campus. The Whitley Theological Center,  Oblate Renewal Center, Immaculate Conception Memorial Chapel, O'Shaughnessy Library, Pat Guidon Center, Lourdes Grotto & Guadalupe Tepeyac, Benson Theological Center, Southwestern Oblate Historical Archives, Labyrinth of the Little Flower, and the Last Supper are all found on the campus.

Notable alumni
Stephen Jay Berg (M.Div., 1999), Bishop of Pueblo

References

External links
 Official website

Universities and colleges accredited by the Southern Association of Colleges and Schools
Universities and colleges in San Antonio
Educational institutions established in 1903
1903 establishments in Texas
Missionary Oblates of Mary Immaculate